Bedryazh is a rural locality (a selo) and the administrative center of Bedryazhinskoye Rural Settlement, Chernushinsky District, Perm Krai, Russia. The population was 452 as of 2010. There are 3 streets.

Geography 
Bedryazh is located 17 km northwest of Chernushka (the district's administrative centre) by road. Andronovo is the nearest rural locality.

References 

Rural localities in Chernushinsky District